Locust Ridge is an unincorporated community in Brown County, in the U.S. state of Ohio.

History
The first settlement at Locust Ridge was made around 1835. A post office called Locust Ridge was established in 1856, and remained in operation until 1907.

References

Unincorporated communities in Brown County, Ohio
1835 establishments in Ohio
Populated places established in 1835
Unincorporated communities in Ohio